Peter E. Haas (December 20, 1918 – December 3, 2005) was an American billionaire businessman who served as president and CEO (1976–2005) and chairman (1981–1989) of Levi Strauss & Co.

Biography
Haas was born to a Jewish family in San Francisco, one of three children of Walter A. Haas and Elise Stern. Haas was the great-grandnephew of Levi Strauss, the founder of denim manufacturer Levi Strauss & Co. and great grandson of David Stern. He attended the Deerfield Academy preparatory school in Massachusetts. In 1940, he graduated from University of California, Berkeley with a bachelor's degree in economics. After school, he went to work for an advertising agency in San Francisco. He was rejected by the military because of poor eyesight. In 1943, he graduated cum laude as a Baker Scholar from the Harvard Graduate School of Business Administration and then worked as a welder until the end of World War II. After the war, he went to work for the family company, Levi Strauss & Co, with his older brother, Walter A. Haas Jr. Under his tenure, the Levi Strauss Company became one of the first American clothing companies to racially integrate its workforce in the South prior to the U.S. civil rights movement. Haas served as president and member of the board of directors from 1970 to 1981. In 1976, he became president and chief executive officer, and from 1981 until 1989, he was chairman of the board. From 1989 until his death, he was chairman of the company's executive committee.

From 1966 to 1975 and from 1994 to 1997, he served as a trustee for the UC Berkeley Foundation. Due to the fact that his son Michael was developmentally disabled, Haas was a strong supporter of San Francisco Aid for Retarded Children. Haas served as president of the Jewish Welfare Federation (later known as the Jewish Community Federation), which his grandfather, Abraham Haas, had helped to organize, from 1976 to 1978.

Personal life
Haas was married twice. He had three children with his first wife, Kaw City, Oklahoma native and gentile, Josephine Baum: Peter E. Haas Jr., Margaret E. Haas (adopted), and Michael Stern Haas (predeceased). His son Peter served with the Levi Strauss Company in various capacities and was married to Joanne Christensen. Haas also has two stepsons with his second wife, Miriam "Mimi" Lurie: Ari Lurie and Daniel Lurie. Haas died in 2005. A memorial service was held at Temple Emanu-El in San Francisco. He passed his interest in Levi Strauss to his wife and children.

Awards and honors
1996 – Golden Plate Award of the American Academy of Achievement
1996 – Berkeley Medal, the school's top honor, and also named the "Alumnus of the Year"
2001 – The Haas School of Business named Haas "Business Leader of the Year" and honored him with a special Lifetime Achievement Award

References

1918 births
2005 deaths
Haas family
20th-century American Jews
University of California, Berkeley alumni
Harvard Business School alumni
Businesspeople from California
People from San Francisco
Stanford University trustees
American billionaires
Levi Strauss & Co. people
Koshland family
21st-century American Jews